Abugawa Dam is an arch gravity dam located in Yamaguchi prefecture in Japan. The dam is used for flood control and power production. The catchment area of the dam is 523 km2. The dam impounds about 420  ha of land when full and can store 153500 thousand cubic meters of water. The construction of the dam was started on 1966 and completed in 1974.

References

Dams in Yamaguchi Prefecture
1974 establishments in Japan